Dr Alexander "Sasha" Tzinker (born 2 January 1953) is a former Israeli politician who served as a member of the Knesset for Yisrael BaAliyah and the Democratic Choice between 1999 and 2003.

Biography
Born in the Ukrainian SSR in the Soviet Union, Tzinker gained an MA at the Polytechnic Institute in Armenia in 1975 and a PhD from the Moscow Scientific Center for Management in 1988. He worked as a systems analyst and made aliyah to Israel in 1990.

For the 1999 elections he was placed sixth on the Yisrael BaAliyah list, and entered the Knesset as the party won six seats. On 20 July 1999, just over a month after the elections, Tzinker and Roman Bronfman left the party to establish a new Knesset faction; six days later it was renamed "Mahar" (a Hebrew acronym for Party for Society and Reforms), and in October adopted the name "Democratic Choice".

Prior to the 2003 elections Tzinker left the Democratic Choice (which was to be allied to Meretz) and established a new party, Citizen and State, which he headed. However, the party received only 1,566 votes (0.05%), well below the 1.5% election threshold, and Tzinker lost his seat.

In the run-up to the 2006 elections, Citizen and State was taken over by former Shinui MKs, led by Avraham Poraz, and renamed Hetz.

References

External links

1953 births
Living people
Ukrainian Jews
Soviet emigrants to Israel
Israeli Jews
Israeli people of Ukrainian-Jewish descent
Democratic Choice (Israel) politicians
Yisrael BaAliyah politicians
Hetz (political party) politicians
Members of the 15th Knesset (1999–2003)